SciTech Software, Inc. was a privately held software company based in Chico, California.

Founded by Kendall Bennett in 1996, SciTech Software, Inc. developed many popular graphics device driver programs for the PC, ranging from UniVESA (later renamed to UniVBE) to SciTech Display Doctor and SciTech SNAP Graphics and SciTech SNAP Audio.

It was purchased by Alt Richmond Inc. in 2008

References

Software companies established in 1996
Privately held companies based in California
Software companies based in California
Defunct software companies of the United States